Spencer Garrett (born September 19, 1963) is an American actor. He is best known for his roles in the films Air Force One (1997), 21 (2008), Public Enemies (2009), All the Way (2016), and The Front Runner (2018).

He is the son of actress Kathleen Nolan and personal manager Richard Heckenkamp.

Selected filmography

References

External links

1963 births
American male film actors
American male television actors
Living people
Male actors from Los Angeles